Romeo & Radhika is an 2016 Gujarati romantic comedy film, directed by Siddharth Trivedi and produced by Suresh M. Shah. The film stars Vidhi Parikh, Tushar Sadhu, Hemang Dave, Shyam Nair. The title of the film is a wordplay on Romeo & Juliet.

Cast
 Vidhi Parikh as Radhika
 Tushar Sadhu as Rahul
 Hemang Dave as Bhuppi
 Shyam Nair as Sunny
 Shahbaz Khan as JD
 Mushtaq Khan as Mehtaji
 Raj Premi as Velji
 Javed Haider as Chandu
 Sharad Sharma as Prof. Nandan
 Sharad Vyas as Mohandas
 Rup Divetiya as Gauri
 Prabhakar Shukla as Imtiyaz Ali
 Pratish Vora as Amar
 Kanwal Taff as Ayesha
 Riddhi Raval as Prof. Lovleen
 Ritika Jilka as Juhi
 Rashmi Banker as Prof. Komal
 Bhuman Bhatt as Dr. Rathod

Production
The film was announced in September 2015. The film began shooting in September 2015 in Palanpur.

Music
The soundtrack of the album is composed by Vinay Kapadia with lyrics written by Dashrath Mewal. The soundtrack album consists of five tracks.

Soundtrack

Vinay Kapadia composed the music. The songs are sung by Vinay Kapadia, Rahul Jain, Pallavi Kelkar and Tarika Bhatia, and the lyrics of were written by Dashrath Mewal.

Release
The trailer for the film was released on 16 June 2016. The film will be released on 15 July 2016.

References

External links
 
 
 

2016 films
2016 romantic comedy films
Films shot in India
Films set in Ahmedabad
Films shot in Ahmedabad
Films shot in Gujarat
Indian romantic comedy films
2010s Gujarati-language films